Perry Hall is an unincorporated community and census-designated place in Baltimore County, Maryland, United States. The population was 28,474 at the 2010 census. It is a suburb of Baltimore.

Geography

Education

Elementary schools 
 Perry Hall Elementary
 Gunpowder Elementary
 Seven Oaks Elementary
 Joppa View Elementary
 Chapel Hill Elementary
 Honeygo Elementary
    Rossville  Elementry

Middle schools 

 Perry Hall Middle
Perry Hall Middle School is the largest middle school in Baltimore County.  Current enrollment is 1851 students.  The state rated school capacity is 1643. Enrollment projections released by Baltimore County Public Schools on Feb 20, 2017, indicate Perry Hall Middle School will have 2075 students in the 2018–19 school year.  As of Feb 25, 2017, The Baltimore County Board of Education has not released any information on a plan to alleviate the overcapacity situation. http://www.bcps.org/schools/profile.aspx?OrgID=103,   https://www.boarddocs.com/mabe/bcps/Board.nsf/files/AJDM3R56FD9D/$file/SC2016%20FINAL%20020217.pdf

High schools 
 Perry Hall High School

Demographics

As of the census of 2000, there were 28,705 people, 11,578 households, and 7,884 families residing in the CDP. The racial makeup of the CDP was 88.79% White, 4.53% African American, 0.11% Native American, 5.08% Asian, 0.03% Pacific Islander, 0.37% from other races, and 1.10% from two or more races. Hispanic or Latino of any race were 1.50% of the population.

There were 11,328 households, out of which 33.5% had children under the age of 18 living with them, 56.3% were married couples living together, 9.9% had a female householder with no husband present, and 30.4% were non-families. 23.8% of all households were made up of individuals, and 7.2% had someone living alone who was 65 years of age or older. The average household size was 2.53, and the average family size was 3.03.

In the CDP, the population was spread out, with 24.2% under the age of 18, 7.4% from 18 to 24, 32.7% from 25 to 44, 24.0% from 45 to 64, and 11.6% who were 65 years of age or older. The median age was 37 years. For every 100 females, there were 92.8 males. For every 100 females age 18 and over, there were 88.6 males.

The median income for a household in the CDP was $57,033, and the median income for a family was $65,632 (these figures had risen to $74,450 and $84,093 respectively as of a 2007 estimate). Males had a median income of $42,371 versus $33,834 for females. The per capita income for the CDP was $26,361. About 2.3% of families and 2.9% of the population were below the poverty line, including 3.5% of those under age 18 and 3.2% of those age 65 or over.

Perry Hall Improvement Association

The Perry Hall Improvement Association (PHIA) is the oldest and largest civic organization in northeastern Baltimore County, Maryland.  Since Perry Hall is not incorporated, the PHIA is the dominant communitywide coalition in the area. 
 
An early version of the PHIA operated during the Second World War when Perry Hall residents organized a Health Committee to help veterans purchase wheelchairs, crutches, and other equipment.  After the war ended, many of these leaders decided to create a permanent organization.  The first meeting of the Perry Hall Improvement Association was held on July 31, 1945.

After World War II, there was a wave of growth in northeastern Baltimore County.  The PHIA defeated plans for a cemetery on the South Farm, a racetrack on Forge Road, and a drive-in movie theater near St. Joseph's Roman Catholic Church.  The PHIA also lobbied for lights along Joppa, Forge, and Cross Roads and Schroeder and Bauer Avenues.  The PHIA pressured Baltimore County officials to fund road improvements and build new schools.  Its most significant accomplishment came on September 8, 1963, when Baltimore County Executive Spiro Agnew and other officials dedicated the new Perry Hall library on Belair Road.

The PHIA worked on civic activities as well, starting a Community Christmas Party in 1946 and a Halloween Parade in 1949. In 1976, the PHIA helped form a Bicentennial Committee that hosted events at the old Perry Hall School. By the 1970s and 1980s, however, leaders spent much of their time dealing with development.  The most symbolic loss for the community was the development of Lassahn Field, long used for soccer games, carnivals, and Easter egg hunts.

By the early 1990s, the community celebrated the opening of the Seven Oaks Senior Center and two new elementary schools, Seven Oaks and Joppa View.  In 1994, the PHIA provided critical local support for the Honeygo Plan, a blueprint for developing Perry Hall's rural northeast.

With the Honeygo Plan adopted and much of the community now built-out, the PHIA focused in the late 1990s on some of the civic activities that had been abandoned years earlier.  In 2000, Perry Hall celebrated its 225th birthday.  The PHIA worked with other groups to restart the Halloween Parade and begin a summer concert series, the centerpiece of which was a performance by the Baltimore Symphony Orchestra.  Also, that year, the PHIA worked with other groups and elected officials to preserve the Perry Hall Mansion.  The mansion was listed on the National Register of Historic Places in 1980. In November 2001, Baltimore County leaders announced plans to purchase the property.

Between 1996 and 2009, the PHIA membership grew from 200 members to more than 2,000. Recently, the PHIA has focused on construction of a new Perry Hall Schools, completion of several new parks, stopping overdevelopment, and strategies to reduce school overcrowding.

The PHIA is governed by an executive board that includes Jack Amrhein, president; Kevin Leary, vice-president; Tom Benisch, treasurer; Renee Papavasiliou, secretary; and several members-at-large members.

References

Sources
"Crossroads:  The History of Perry Hall," by David Marks

External links

Perry Hall Improvement Association
Perry Hall Improvement Association (PHIA) records, 1945-1986 at the University of Maryland, Baltimore County
Friends of the Perry Hall Mansion
Old photo looking south on Belair Rd at Silver Spring Rd

Census-designated places in Baltimore County, Maryland
Census-designated places in Maryland